Murder of a Martinet is a 1951 detective novel by E.C.R. Lorac, the pen name of the British writer Edith Caroline Rivett. It is the thirty fifth in her long-running series featuring Chief Inspector MacDonald of Scotland Yard. It was published in the United States by Doubleday under the alternative title of I Could Murder Her.

Synopsis
In a manor house in the English countryside Muriel Farrington rules over her various grown children like a martinet, keeping them all in line whenever anyone threatens to dissent from her. When she is found dead, MacDonald is called in to cast his eye over several possible culprits.

References

Bibliography
 Cooper, John & Pike, B.A. Artists in Crime: An Illustrated Survey of Crime Fiction First Edition Dustwrappers, 1920-1970. Scolar Press, 1995.
 Hubin, Allen J. Crime Fiction, 1749-1980: A Comprehensive Bibliography. Garland Publishing, 1984.
 Nichols, Victoria & Thompson, Susan. Silk Stalkings: More Women Write of Murder. Scarecrow Press, 1998.
 Reilly, John M. Twentieth Century Crime & Mystery Writers. Springer, 2015.

1951 British novels
British mystery novels
Novels by E.C.R. Lorac
Novels set in England
British detective novels
Collins Crime Club books